Kazuhito Futagami (Japanese 二神 一人; born 3 June 1987) is a Japanese professional baseball pitcher who currently plays for the Hanshin Tigers of Nippon Professional Baseball.

References

1987 births
Living people
Japanese baseball players
Nippon Professional Baseball pitchers
Hanshin Tigers players